Liam Pitchford (born 12 July 1993) is a British table tennis player. As of January 2023, he is ranked the No. 24 player in the world. He is currently sponsored by Victas.

Career
Pitchford began playing table tennis when he was eight years old. He won the British Home Countries Championship in 2009, and two Commonwealth Games medals in 2010 (Silver in Team and Bronze in Doubles).

In the summer of 2011, he transferred to German club TTF Liebherr Ochsenhausen in the top division, the Bundesliga, having played for second division club FC Tegernheim the previous season. From 2009 to 2010 Pitchford played for Aarhus BTK in the best Danish league. In July 2014, his contract with Ochsenhausen was extended by three years.

In the autumn of 2011, he beat World number nine Vladimir Samsonov and World junior number three Wu Jiaji in international competitions, paving his route to becoming number one in the English rankings in November 2011. He finished the year with a career-high World ranking of 171 to become the third highest-ranked British player on the ITTF World Ranking list, and was subsequently part of the Team GB squad for the London Olympics in 2012.

Pitchford has won national singles titles at U14, Cadet, U21 and Senior levels, and doubles titles at U14, Cadet, Junior and Senior levels. He is the reigning men's singles national champion (March 2015).

In 2014 he was part of the England men's team which clinched promotion to the top level of world table tennis at the World Team Championships in Japan.

Pitchford represented England at the 2014 Commonwealth Games in Glasgow, winning a silver medal in the team competition as Singapore took gold in a repeat of the 2010 result. He also won a silver medal alongside Tin-Tin Ho in the mixed doubles, and won the bronze medal in the men's singles. In August 2014 he reached a career high of No 44 in the ITTF world rankings.

At the 2015 World Table Tennis Championships, Pitchford showed growth by reaching the round of 32 in men's singles. He beat two-time World Cup runner-up Kalinikos Kreanga and world number 20 Tiago Apolonia before losing to South Korean Joo Sae-hyuk.

In June 2015, Pitchford was part of the Great Britain table tennis squad at the inaugural European Games in Baku, where he reached the quarter-finals.

In March 2016, Pitchford was part of the England team, alongside Paul Drinkhall and Sam Walker, which won bronze medals at the World Team Championships in Malaysia, England's first medal at that level since 1983 and the first time a newly promoted team had earned a podium place at the event.

Pitchford competed for Team GB in the singles and team events at the Rio 2016 Olympics. He reached the last 32 in the singles and, alongside Paul Drinkhall and Sam Walker, beat France to reach the quarter-finals of the team event, where GB were beaten by China.

In July 2017, Pitchford helped the Falcons team to win the inaugural Ultimate Table Tennis league in India.

In February 2018, Pitchford was part of the England squad alongside Paul Drinkhall, Sam Walker, David McBeath and Tom Jarvis which won bronze medals by reaching the semi-finals of the ITTF Team World Cup in front of a home crowd at the Copper Box Arena in London.

At the Commonwealth Games in Australia in 2018, Pitchford won the gold medal in the men's doubles alongside Paul Drinkhall, the silver medal in the mixed doubles alongside Tin-Tin Ho and was part of the England squad which won men's team bronze, alongside Drinkhall, Sam Walker and David McBeath.

At the 2018 Bulgaria Open, Pitchford beat current Olympic and World champion Ma Long in the first round in a 7 set match, arguably the biggest win of his career. However, in the next round he lost to Ma Long's Chinese teammate Ma Te.

That victory, and a series of other notable wins, saw Pitchford break into the world's top 20 for the first time in December 2018, at No 16.

In November 2019, Pitchford reached the last 16 of the Austrian Open losing 4–0 to the German player Timo Boll. In the last 32, Pitchford defeated 2016 Olympic Bronze medalist Jun Mizutani 4–3.

The 2020 Qatar Open proved to be an enormously successful outing. Pitchford began with a tense 4–2 win over Spain's Álvaro Robles and followed it up with another 4–2 victory over the evergreen Vladimir Samsonov who had just upset the fourth seed Lin Gaoyuan in the previous round. In the quarterfinal, Pitchford accounted for the in-form Chinese Taipei legend, Chuang Chih-yuan. But it was the semifinal that proved to be the match of the tournament. In a thrilling six game encounter, dishing out one of the best performances of his life, Pitchford beat the reigning world number one, Xu Xin, an opponent Pitchford had never managed to take a game off before. The final against Fan Zhendong was a spectacular affair and Xiao Pang certainly had to dig deep to eventually overcome Pitchford in a nail-biting 4–2 match.
At the same event, Pitchford and Paul Drinkhall reached the men's doubles final, losing to China's Ma Long and Xu Xin.

2021 
In 2021, one week before the World Table Tennis inaugural event WTT Doha, Liam Pitchford suffered a minor hand injury while looping a half-long ball in practice. As a result, he felt pain whenever he used his backhand and suffered an early first-round upset to Andrea Levenko in the first WTT Contender event and a round-of-32 upset to Kristian Karlsson in the second WTT Star Contender Event.

Pitchford was upset by Darko Jorgic in the round of 32 in the men's singles event at the Tokyo Olympics.

2022 
At the Birmingham 2022 Commonwealth Games, Pitchford and Paul Drinkhall successfully defended their men's doubles title. Pitchford also reached the men's singles final, where he was beaten by Sharath Kamal Achanta of India. He, Drinkhall, Sam Walker and Tom Jarvis won bronze in the men's team event.

2023

Liam is currently ranked number 24 in the world.

See also
 List of England players at the World Team Table Tennis Championships

References

External links
 
 Liam Pitchford at Table Tennis Media
 

1993 births
Living people
Olympic table tennis players of Great Britain
English male table tennis players
Table tennis players at the 2012 Summer Olympics
Table tennis players at the 2016 Summer Olympics
Table tennis players at the 2020 Summer Olympics
Table tennis players at the 2010 Commonwealth Games
Table tennis players at the 2014 Commonwealth Games
Table tennis players at the 2018 Commonwealth Games
Table tennis players at the 2022 Commonwealth Games
Commonwealth Games silver medallists for England
Commonwealth Games bronze medallists for England
European Games competitors for Great Britain
Table tennis players at the 2015 European Games
Table tennis players at the 2019 European Games
Sportspeople from Chesterfield, Derbyshire
Commonwealth Games medallists in table tennis
Expatriate table tennis people in Japan
Medallists at the 2010 Commonwealth Games
Medallists at the 2014 Commonwealth Games
Medallists at the 2018 Commonwealth Games
Medallists at the 2022 Commonwealth Games